The New Zealand women's national cricket team toured Australia in June 2009. They played against Australia in three Twenty20 Internationals, with Australia winning the series 2–1. The series preceded both teams' participation in the 2009 ICC Women's World Twenty20.

Squads

WT20I Series

1st T20I

2nd T20I

3rd T20I

References

External links
New Zealand Women tour of Australia 2009 from Cricinfo

Women's international cricket tours of Australia
2009 in Australian cricket
New Zealand women's national cricket team tours